The 14315 / 16 Bareilly New Delhi Intercity Express is an Express train belonging to Indian Railways - Northern Railway zone that runs between Bareilly & New Delhi in India.

It operates as train number 14315 from Bareilly to New Delhi and as train number 14316 in the reverse direction serving the states of Uttar Pradesh & Delhi.

Coaches

The 14315 / 16 Bareilly New Delhi Intercity Express has 2 AC Chair Car, 9 Second Class seating, 7 General Unreserved & 2 SLR (Seating cum Luggage Rake) Coaches. It does not carry a Pantry car coach.
 
As is customary with most train services in India, Coach Composition may be amended at the discretion of Indian Railways depending on demand.

Service

As the average speed of the train is below , as per Indian Railways rules, its fare does not include a Superfast surcharge.

Routeing

The 14315 / 16 Bareilly New Delhi Intercity Express runs from Bareilly via Rampur, Moradabad junction, Gajraula Junction, Hapur, Ghaziabad, Anand Vihar Terminal to New Delhi.

Traction

As the track between these cities is totally electrified, a Ghaziabad based WAP 4 or WAP 5 locomotive powers the train for its entire journey.

References 

 https://www.youtube.com/watch?v=zMevmReHfRw
 http://www.nr.indianrailways.gov.in/view_detail.jsp?lang=0&dcd=3437&id=0,4,268
 http://timesofindia.indiatimes.com/city/lucknow/Rlys-cancel-11-trains-due-to-Jat-agitation/articleshow/7658657.cms
 https://www.flickr.com/photos/50628848@N07/8205604350/

External links

Trains from Bareilly
Transport in Delhi
Rail transport in Delhi
Intercity Express (Indian Railways) trains